Christian Nyman (born February 3, 1991) is a Swedish professional ice hockey player. He played with Luleå HF in the Elitserien during the 2010–11 Elitserien season.

References

External links

1991 births
Luleå HF players
Living people
Swedish ice hockey forwards
People from Luleå
Sportspeople from Norrbotten County